The following radio stations broadcast on AM frequency 1220 kHz: 1220 AM is a Mexican clear-channel frequency. XEB Mexico City is the dominant Class A station on 1220 kHz.

In Argentina
 Eco Medios in Buenos Aires

In Canada
 CJRB in Boissevain, Manitoba - 10 kW, transmitter located at 
 CFAJ in St. Catharines, Ontario, Canada - 10 kW, transmitter located at

In Mexico
Stations in bold are clear-channel stations.
 XEB-AM in San Lorenzo Tezonco, Mexico City - 100 kW, transmitter located at 
  in Saltillo, Coahuila

In the United States

References

Lists of radio stations by frequency